Gnomonia leptostyla is a fungal plant pathogen. It is newly named Ophiognomonia leptostyla and occurs on walnut (Juglans spp.) and causes leaf blotch and leaf spots which is called walnut anthracnose or walnut black spot. The anamorph is Marssoniella juglandis.

References

External links 
 Index Fungorum
 USDA ARS Fungal Database

Fungal tree pathogens and diseases
Nut tree diseases
Gnomoniaceae
Fungi described in 1815